A washerwoman or laundress is a woman who takes in laundry. Both terms are now old-fashioned; equivalent work nowadays is done by a laundry worker in large commercial premises, or a laundrette (laundromat) attendant.

Description

As evidenced by the character of Nausicaa in the Odyssey, in the social conventions depicted by Homer and evidently taken for granted in Greek society of the time, there was nothing unusual or demeaning in a princess and her handmaidens personally washing laundry. However, in later times this was mostly considered as the work of women of low social status. The Magdalene asylums chose laundering as a suitable occupation for the "fallen women" they accommodated. 

In between these two extremes, the various sub-divisions of laundry workers in 19th-century France (blanchisseuse, lavandière, laveuse, buandière, repasseuse, etc.) were respected for their trade. A festival in their honour was held at the end of winter (Mi-Careme, halfway through Lent, i.e. three weeks after Mardi Gras or Shrove Tuesday). This festival has now been revived as Mi-Carême au Carnaval de Paris. 

The wet nurse to George III of the United Kingdom, who was born two months prematurely, was so valued by the king when he grew up that her daughter was appointed laundress to the Royal Household, "a sinecure place of great emolument".

In many cultures, laundry was seen as "women's work", so the village wash-house (lavoir) acted as a space for women to gather and talk together as they washed clothes. While having a significant social function in various human cultures over thousands of years, the spread of washing machines and self-service laundries has rendered washerwomen unnecessary in much of the contemporary world.

In culture

The subject of laundresses or washerwomen was a popular one in art, especially in France, see WikiCommons.

In literature, the washerwoman may be a convenient disguise, as with Toad, one of the protagonists of The Wind in the Willows (1908), in order to escape from prison; and in The Penultimate Peril story of the Lemony Snicket book series A Series of Unfortunate Events, Kevin the Ambidextrous Man poses as a washerwoman who works in the laundry room at the Hotel Denouement.

Also, washerwomen serve as characters depicting the working poor, as for example in A Christmas Carol: when the Ghost of Christmas Yet to Come showed Ebenezer Scrooge his future where he is dead, the laundress assists the charwoman Mrs. Dilber and the unnamed undertaker into stealing some of Scrooge's belongings and selling them to a fence named Old Joe.

In Power Rangers Beast Morphers, the character Zoey Reeves started out as a washerwoman for Grid Battleforce.

See also
 Dhobi, the washermen of India
 Baths and wash houses in Britain
 Blanchisseuse, a village named after its washerwomen
 Les Lavandières, a group of three old women in Celtic folklore
 Charwoman, a similar occupation, involving cleaning houses and offices

References

Laundry occupations
Gendered occupations
Domestic work
Archaic English words and phrases